North Branch Neshaminy Creek is one of two main branches of the Neshaminy Creek, the other being the West Branch. Rising in Plumstead Township, Bucks County, Pennsylvania, passing through the Peace Valley Park as Lake Galena, then meeting with the West Branch forming the main branch of the Neshaminy.

Statistics
The Geographic Name Information System I.D. is 1182546, U.S. Department of the Interior Geological Survey I.D. is 02789.

Course
The North Branch of the Neshaminy Creek rises in Plumstead Township east of Pennsylvania Route 413 north of the village of Gardenville, it flows southwest passing through Lake Galena in Peace Valley Park. Then it turns south to meet with the main branch of the Neshaminy.

Named Tributaries
Pine Run

Municipalities
Bucks County
Chalfont Borough
New Britain Township
Plumstead Township

Crossings and Bridges

See also
List of rivers of Pennsylvania
List of rivers of the United States
List of Delaware River tributaries

References

Rivers of Bucks County, Pennsylvania
Rivers of Pennsylvania
Tributaries of the Neshaminy Creek